Emergency is a 1962 British drama film directed by Francis Searle and starring Glyn Houston, Zena Walker and Dermot Walsh. The film is a remake of the 1952 film Emergency Call directed by Lewis Gilbert. While that had been made as a first feature to top the double bill, the remake was produced as a second feature.

It was shot at Twickenham Studios and on location around West London. The film's sets were designed by the art director Duncan Sutherland.

Synopsis
After a small girl is hit by a truck, police desperately try to find members of her rare blood group in order to get a transfusion.

Cast
 Glyn Houston as Inspector Harris 
 Zena Walker as Joan Bell 
 Dermot Walsh as John Bell 
 Colin Tapley as Dr. Lloyd 
 Garard Green as Professor Graham 
 Anthony Dawes as Sergeant Phillips 
 Patrick Jordan as Jimmy Regan 
 Edward Ogden as Tommy Day 
 Helen Forrest as Mrs. Day 
 Sidney Vivian as Shaw 
 John Boxer as Prison Governor

References

Bibliography
 Chibnall, Steve & McFarlane, Brian. The British 'B' Film. Palgrave MacMillan, 2009.

External links

1962 films
British drama films
1962 drama films
1960s English-language films
Films directed by Francis Searle
Films shot at Twickenham Film Studios
Butcher's Film Service films
Films shot in London
Films set in London
Remakes of British films
1960s British films